Truth is the fourth studio album by Israeli-American blues artist Guy King. Released in 2016, the album is a blend of blues, jazz, funk, and soul. King's vocals on the album were heavily influenced by Ray Charles's vocal stylings. Truth reached #1 at the Roots music report -Contemporary Blues Chart, and #5 at the Living Blues Chart.

Background
Truth is an album with a big band sound, that primarily is composed of two genres: jazz and Chicago blues. The album contains, "blues, funk, soul, and everything in between."

Release and reception
Dan Bindert of Chicago Blues Guide said, "...he (Guy King) plays it sophisticated and soulful, with a sense of taste and genuine feeling that's sometimes lacking in contemporary blues. It's easily the Israeli-born guitarist's most fully realized recording yet, with top flight production."

John Mitchell of Blues Blast Magazine opined: "The style is relaxed with more than a touch of jazz in Guy’s playing, at times recalling George Benson in his prime."

Personnel

Guy King Band
Guy King – Lead guitar, Rhythm guitar, vocals
Amr Marcin Fahmy - Rhodes B3 Hammond Organ 
Jake Vinsel - bass 
George Fludas - Drums, 
Marques Carroll - Trumpet
Christopher Neal - Tenor Saxophone
Brent Griffin Jr - Baritone Saxophone 
Sahrah Marie Young, Kiara Shackelford and Jihan Murray-Smith -Background Vocals

References

2016 albums
Guy King albums
Delmark Records albums